The Global Community Engagement and Resilience Fund (GCERF) is a nonprofit foundation based in Geneva, Switzerland. It is the first global effort to support local, community-level initiatives aimed at strengthening resilience against violent extremist agendas.

The Guardian described the organization as "The world’s first global counter-terrorism “bank”."

The foundation was announced by US Secretary of State John Kerry and Turkish Foreign Minister Ahmet Davutoglu at the fourth Global Counterterrorism Forum Ministerial in New York, on 27 September 2013.  On 9 September 2014, the foundation was officially established. A Headquarters Agreement conferring to GCERF the status of an international organisation in
Switzerland was signed on 26 May 2015.

Nineteen donors and the private sector have contributed more than USD 100 million for GCERF programming.

Partner countries
Countries receiving assistance are:

 Albania
 Bangladesh
 Bosnia and Herzegovina 
 Burkina Faso
 Kenya
 Kosovo
 Mali
 Niger
 Nigeria
 North Macedonia
 Philippines
 Somalia
 Sri Lanka
 Tunisia

Donors
Donors are:

 Australia
 Canada
 Denmark
 France
 Germany
 Italy
 Japan
 Liechtenstein
 Morocco
 European Union
 Netherlands
 New Zealand
 Norway
 Qatar
 Spain
 Sweden
 Switzerland
 United Kingdom
 United States of America

References 

Organizations established in 2014
Organisations based in Geneva